The 2005 East Carolina Pirates football team was an American football team that represented East Carolina University as a member of Conference USA during the 2005 NCAA Division I-A football season. In their first season under head coach Skip Holtz, the team compiled a 5–6 record.

Schedule

References

East Carolina
East Carolina Pirates football seasons
East Carolina Pirates football